R is a 2010 Danish prison drama film written and directed by Tobias Lindholm and Michael Noer, and starring Pilou Asbæk. The film was produced by Nordisk Film. The film follows Rune Pedersen (Pilou Asbæk), who is serving a prison sentence of two years in Horsens State Prison. Here he is set to do the dirty work of distributing drugs between departments.

The film premiered at the 2010 International Film Festival Rotterdam, was released in Denmark on April 22, 2010.

Cast 
 Pilou Asbæk as Rune
  as Rashid
 Roland Møller as Mureren
 Jacob Gredsted as Carsten
  as Bazhir

Accolades 
The film won the Bodil Award for Best Danish Film in 2011. Asbæk received a Bodil Award for Best Actor in a Leading Role for his performance as Rune. The director Tobias Lindholm scored a Bodil Honorary Award for his films Submarino and R. The film won the same year the Robert Award for Best Danish Film.

References

External links 
 
 
 
 

2010 drama films
2010 films
Best Danish Film Bodil Award winners
Best Danish Film Robert Award winners
Danish drama films
2010s Danish-language films
Films directed by Tobias Lindholm
Films shot in Denmark
Films with screenplays by Tobias Lindholm
Nordisk Film films
Films directed by Michael Noer